is a Japanese actress and tarento.

For the 2011 Japanese movie Rebirth she received one of the seven Newcomer of the Year awards at the 35th edition of the Japan Academy Prize.

She is also known for the 2014 television drama Ashita, Mama ga Inai, in which she starred alongside child actresses Mana Ashida and Rio Suzuki.

Filmography

Films 
 Rebirth (2011)

Television
 Segodon (2018), young Iwayama Ito

Awards 
 35th Japan Academy Prize (2012) — Newcomer of the Year

Discography

Singles

References

External links 
 Official agency profile - 
 

2006 births
Living people
Actresses from Osaka Prefecture
Japanese child actresses
Japanese television personalities